Aristide Guarneri (born 7 March 1938) is an Italian former footballer who played as a defender. Initially a fullback at the beginning of his career, he was later usually deployed as a centre-back, where he excelled due to his anticipation, tackling, marking, and ability to read the game. Guarneri was known as a "gentleman of the game", as he never received a red-card throughout his career, despite being a tenacious defender.

Club career
Guarnieri began his youth career with Codogna, and he made his professional debut for Como in 1957, also playing for Internazionale, Bologna, Napoli, and ending his career with Cremonese 1973. He most notably player for the Inter Milan team known as La Grande Inter under manager Helenio Herrera, between 1958 and 1967, briefly returning to the club to make 3 appearances during the 1969–70 season. He was part of Inter's European Cup victories in 1964 and 1965, also winning three Serie A titles, two Intercontinental Cups in 1964 and 1965. Although he was unable to win the Coppa Italia throughout his career, he reached the final during the 1964–65 season, narrowly missing out on a treble with Inter.

International career
Guarnieri obtained 21 caps for Italy between 1963–1968, scoring one goal against the USSR in 1966, with Lev Yashin in goal. He made his debut against the defending World Champions Brazil on 12 May 1963, which ended in a 3–0 victory for Italy. He was included in Italy's squad for the 1966 FIFA World Cup, playing one game, and he won the 1968 UEFA European Football Championship with Italy, on home soil.

Honours

Club
Inter
Serie A: 1962–63, 1964–65, 1965–66
European Cup: 1963–64, 1964–65
Intercontinental Cup: 1964, 1965

International
Italy
UEFA European Championship: 1968

References

1938 births
Living people
Sportspeople from Cremona
Italian footballers
Italy international footballers
1966 FIFA World Cup players
UEFA Euro 1968 players
UEFA European Championship-winning players
Inter Milan players
S.S.C. Napoli players
U.S. Cremonese players
Como 1907 players
Bologna F.C. 1909 players
Serie A players
Association football defenders
UEFA Champions League winning players
Footballers from Lombardy
A.C.D. Sant'Angelo 1907 managers
U.S. Cremonese managers
U.S. Fiorenzuola 1922 S.S. managers
Inter Milan non-playing staff